William Knox Sander (born April 16, 1956) is an American professional golfer.

Amateur career 
Sander won the 1976 U.S. Amateur. He also competed in the 1976 Eisenhower Trophy and the 1977 Walker Cup match. In 1976 he was ranked the #3 amateur in the country.

Professional career 
Sander played on the PGA Tour from 1979 to 1992 during his 15 years as a professional golfer. He twice finished runner-up: 1988 Los Angeles Open and 1991 Shearson Lehman Brothers Open.

Amateur wins
this list may be incomplete
1976 U.S. Amateur, Pacific Northwest Amateur

See also
Spring 1978 PGA Tour Qualifying School graduates
1982 PGA Tour Qualifying School graduates
1983 PGA Tour Qualifying School graduates
1986 PGA Tour Qualifying School graduates

References

External links

American male golfers
PGA Tour golfers
Golfers from Seattle
1956 births
Living people